Falange Española Auténtica (FEA) was a neo-fascist and anti-Francoist political party in Spain.

History
Falange Española Auténtica was founded in 1978 by expelled members of the Falange Española de las JONS (Auténtica) led by Miguel Hedilla. In 1984, Miguel Hedilla resigned as leader of the party and Ángel Gómez Puértolas took his place. In 1994, FEA ceased to exist after the majority of members left the party and joined Falange Española de las JONS.

Electoral results

References

Neo-fascist parties
Falangist parties
Fascist parties in Spain
1978 establishments in Spain
Political parties established in 1978
1994 disestablishments in Spain
Political parties disestablished in 1994
Anti-Francoism